Reserved for the Death is an East German film. It was released in 1963.

Plot
Former East German engineer Erich Becker had been lured to West Germany by promises of a high reward. Now residing in Stockholm, he is recalled to serve as a spy in the East. He is to convince Dr. Jadenburg to flee from the GDR with the help of his daughter Hanna, who works for the West. While travelling on the train with Hanna, he is told that he is also to murder another agent who betrayed and now works for the Stasi. The traitor is revealed to be a former friend of Becker, Harry Korb. Becker cannot bring himself to kill Korb when they meet. Korb tells him that it was all a test to prove if he is reliable; since Becker failed, Korb murders him. The Stasi agents capture Korb soon after.

Cast

 Hans-Peter Minetti: Erich Becker
 Peter Herden: Harry Korb
 Irma Münch: Hanna Melvien
 Martin Flörchinger: Dr. Jadenburg
 Hannjo Hasse: Captain Donath
 Peter Sturm: conductor
 Heinz Hinze: Charles Renier
 Herbert Köfer: Cellist
 Hans Klering: blonde man
 Horst Schönemann: Stein
 Werner Lierck: young husband
 Gertrud Brendler: Mrs. Simmel
 Klaus Gendries: Border Police officer
 Harry Studt: Grott

Production
Reserved for the Death was, according to author Sabine Hake, one of a "hyperbole of espionage thrillers" produced soon after the erection of the Berlin Wall.

Writer Gerhard Bensch told in an interview that the plot was based on "numerous authentic documents, files and details" gleaned by him from the intelligence services. After an evaluation board of DEFA viewed the unedited picture before its release, its members concluded that the producers managed to create a "good picture... Exposing the inhuman methods of the Imperialists... And allowing the audience to see the experiences of our society's heroes, engaged in brutal class struggle."

Reception
The reviewer of the East German Berliner Zeitung called the film "a better-than-average criminal film, that will surely be well received by the public." On 5 July 1963, the film critic of the West German Rheinische Merkur wrote that the film was a "disturbing piece of nonsense... Communist picture of the lowest sort."

The German Film Lexicon described "Reserved for the Death" as "a lurid, watchable spy film."

Peter Ulrich Weiss added that it was a typical 'saboteur film', that presented a negative portrayal of West Germany.

References

External links
 
 Reserviert für den Tod on filmportal.de.
 Original poster on ostfilm.de.

1963 films
East German films
1960s German-language films
German black-and-white films
Cold War spy films
German spy films
1960s spy films
1960s German films